Liang Yongbin (born 25 May 1988) is a Paralympian athlete from China competing mainly in T37 classification sprint events. Liang represented his country at the 2012 Summer Paralympics in London where he won a silver medal in the men's 200m sprint. He has also competed at the IPC World Championships in 2015 but did not medal.

Notes

1988 births
Chinese male sprinters
Paralympic athletes of China
Athletes (track and field) at the 2012 Summer Paralympics
Paralympic silver medalists for China
Living people
Medalists at the 2012 Summer Paralympics
Sportspeople from Changchun
Runners from Jilin
Paralympic medalists in athletics (track and field)
21st-century Chinese people